Long March 9 (LM-9 or Changzheng 9, CZ-9) is a Chinese super-heavy carrier rocket concept that is currently under development. It is the ninth iteration of the Long March rocket family, named for the Chinese Red Army's 1934–35 Long March campaign during the Chinese Civil War.

Current plans call for the Long March 9 to have a maximum payload capacity of 150,000 kg to low Earth orbit (LEO) and 54,000 kg to trans-lunar injection.  Its first flight is expected to occur around 2030 in advance of possible Chinese crewed lunar missions sometime during the 2030s.

History

2016, early design 
, the CZ-9 is designed as a three-staged rocket, with a first-stage core diameter of 10 meters and using a cluster of four engines. Multiple variants of the rocket have been proposed, with CZ-9 being the largest: this 'base variant' has four additional liquid-fuel boosters strapped onto the core stage (each individual booster would be up to 5 meters in diameter) and it is this variant that has the aforementioned LEO payload capacity of 140,000 kg. In addition to the base variant, there is the CZ-9A variant which has only two additional boosters and an LEO payload capacity of 100,000 kg. Finally, there is the CZ-9B having only the bare 10-meter diameter core stage and an LEO payload capacity of 50,000 kg. The expected payload capacities of the Long March 9 place it in the class of super heavy-lift launch vehicle; the rocket's development program was formally approved by the Chinese government in 2021.

2021, new design 

On 24 June 2021, Long Lehao, chief designer of the Long March series, provided some updates regarding the Long March 9 at the University of Hong Kong in a presentation titled "Long March Rocket and China's Aerospace". The original design, called the 11th version (2011), had been supplanted by a new design, called the 21st version, which featured many changes, including an enlarged diameter of 10.6 meters, a length of 108 meters, and a weight of 4,122 tons. 16 YF-135 liquid oxygen kerosene engines, each with over 300 tons of thrust, will be used in the first stage; 120-ton hydrogen-oxygen engines will be used in the second and third stages, with four in the second stage and one in the third stage. All fuel tanks were changed to a common bulkhead design, and all external boosters had been removed. The payload capacity to low Earth orbit was increased from 140 to 150 metric tons, and the payload to trans-lunar injection was increased to 53 tons. Long noted that this new version was still under review at the time of the presentation.

The new design is seen as being more suitable for first stage reuse, and a response to SpaceX's Starship. (The 2011 design for LM9 is seen as matching USA's Space Launch System.)

2022, reusable 
On 23 April 2022, Long Lehao, chief designer of the Long March series, provided some updates regarding yet another new design for the Long March 9. This one, referred to as Version 22, is a reusable, booster-less design very similar to Version 21. The second stage and third stages will be powered by 120-tonne hydrolox engines, just like Version 21. Four engines on the second stage and one engine are in the third stage. However, the first-stage and second-stage core diameters have been increased to 11 meters, while the third-stage diameter is 7.5 meters. The total length has been increased to 111 meters, with a mass of 4122 tonnes. The first stage will be powered by twenty-six 200-tonne methane/LOX engines instead of the YF-135 engine from the previous design. Payload capacities are 150 tonnes to LEO and 50 tonnes to TLI.

During October 2022, Long Lehao once again disclosed the new design of the Long March 9. The diameter of the first and second stages of the new version changes back to 10.6 meters, the diameter of the third stage becomes the same as the first and second stages, the total length increases to 114 meters, and the first stage power is changed to twenty-four of 240 tons kerosene/LOX engine. The payload capacity are 100-160 tonnes to LEO, and 35-53 tonnes to TLI.

2023 
During a presentation at the Nanjing University of Science and Technology in March 2023, Long Lehao presented yet another modification to the plans. The reusable first stage is now powered by 30 200-tonnes-thrust rocket engines burning methane and liquid oxygen, while the expendable second stage uses 2 engines of the same type. The third stage is optional and uses a single 120-tonnes thrust liquid hydrogen/liquid oxygen staged combustion engine named the YF-91. Long term plans exists to make the 2nd stage reusable as well.

See also 

 China National Space Administration
 Shenzhou spacecraft
 Space program of China
 Comparison of orbital launchers families
 Comparison of orbital launch systems

References

External links 

 Extensive information on the Chinese space program
 China Great Wall Industry Corporation

Long March (rocket family)
Rocket families
Space launch vehicles of China
Chinese brands